The 2014–15 Purdue Boilermakers men's basketball team represented Purdue University. Their head coach was Matt Painter, in his tenth season with the Boilers. The team played its home games in Mackey Arena in West Lafayette, Indiana, and were members of the Big Ten Conference. They finished the season 21–13, 12–6 in Big Ten play to finish in a three way tie for third place. They advanced to the semifinals of the Big Ten tournament where they lost to Wisconsin. They received an at-large bid to the NCAA tournament where they lost in the second round to Cincinnati.

Previous season
The Boilermakers finished the season 15–17, 5–13 in Big Ten play to finish in last place. They lost in the first round of the Big Ten tournament to Ohio State.

Departures

Roster

Incoming recruits
Isaac Haas, an Alabama native, committed to Purdue on November 18, 2013. Haas' primary reason for committing to Purdue was due to the university's ability to develop its tall players, saying "It's great exposure, and under Matt Painter, almost every 7-footer who went to Purdue went to the NBA." Haas, who originally committed to Wake Forest, was a four star and top 100 recruit.

Vincent Edwards committed to Purdue on September 14, 2013. Edwards was ranked the #80 recruit of 2014. Edwards had been considering which school to commit to since his sophomore year, and said, "“Never in my mind have I had a doubt about Purdue. But of course, I wanted to be sure that I was making the right decision. I felt like it was the right decision to make, so I made it today."

Jacquil Taylor, from Cambridge, Massachusetts committed to Purdue on September 30, 2013. Although Taylor was injured his senior year, there was enough film of him prior to the injury for Purdue to sign him.

Dakota Mathias, a shooting guard from Elida, Ohio, committed to Purdue on May 5, 2013.

P.J. Thompson, from Indianapolis, IN, was the last of the class to commit, committing on March 11, 2014. Thompson, who suffered a foot injury his senior season, was not heavily recruited, and accepted Purdue's late offer. His father, LaSalle, was once a summer teammate of Coach Painter.

Class of 2014 recruits

Class of 2015 recruits

Schedule

|-
!colspan=9 style=|  Exhibition

|-
!colspan=9 style=|  Non-conference regular season

|-
!colspan=9 style=| Big Ten regular season

|-
!colspan=9 style=| Big Ten tournament

|-
|-
!colspan=9 style=| NCAA tournament

See also
2014–15 Purdue Boilermakers women's basketball team

References

Purdue Boilermakers men's basketball seasons
Purdue
Purdue
Purd
Purd